Sphaerodactylus ariasae, commonly called the Jaragua sphaero or the Jaragua dwarf gecko, is the smallest species of lizard in the family Sphaerodactylidae.

Description
Sphaerodactylus ariasae is the world's smallest known reptile. The second-smallest is S. parthenopion, native to the British Virgin Islands. The Jaragua sphaero measures 14-18 mm (0.55-0.71 in) from the snout to the base of the tail and can fit on a US 25-cent coin. It has an average weight of just 0.13 g (0.00455 of an ounce). By contrast, the blue whale is 1,600 times longer and more than 1 billion times heavier.

Geographic range
The geographic range of S. ariasae is believed to be limited to Jaragua National Park, in the southernmost tip of the Barahona Peninsula, in the extreme southwest of the Dominican Republic and nearby forested Beata Island.

Habitat
The preferred natural habitat of S. ariasae is the leaf litter of the forest floor of dry forests with limestone substratum.

Reproduction
S. ariasae is oviparous.

Taxonomy
S. ariasae was first described by Blair Hedges, a Pennsylvania State University evolutionary biologist, and Richard Thomas, a University of Puerto Rico biologist, in the December 2001 issue of the Caribbean Journal of Science.

Etymology
The Jaragua sphaero's binomial name was chosen in honor of herpetologist Yvonne Arias, the leader of the Dominican conservation organization Grupo Jaragua, which was instrumental in securing the environmental protection of Jaragua National Park.

References

External links

National Geographic: Smallest Known Lizard Found in Caribbean
At the Lower Size Limit in Aminote Vertebrates: A New Diminutive Lizard from the West Indies

A
Lizards of the Caribbean
Endemic fauna of the Dominican Republic
Reptiles of the Dominican Republic
Reptiles described in 2001
Taxa named by Stephen Blair Hedges
Taxa named by Richard Thomas (herpetologist)